Emily Carolyn Sweeney (born November 28, 1993) is an American luger. She is the sister of fellow luger Megan Sweeney.

Luge career
During the 2009 World Cup season, Sweeney became Junior World Luge Champion and took bronze medals at the Junior World Cup at Winterberg, Germany and a gold medal at Park City, Utah.

In December 2015, during World Cup competition on their home track in Lake Placid, Sweeney and teammates Erin Hamlin and Summer Britcher swept the field. It marked the first time the U.S. women knocked out the dominant German team.

On November 26, 2017, she won her first World Cup gold medal in the sprint race at Winterberg.

Emily Sweeney was selected as a member of the 2018 USA Olympic Team. At the Pyongchang Games, her first Olympics, Sweeney crashed on her final run, losing control at turn 12 of the Alpensia track after "(catching) a good amount of air" when entering the corner. The neck and back fractures she suffered were figured out some days later. Nine months after her accident, she came back and won a bronze medal at a World Cup race in Whistler, British Columbia.

In 2019, she won a bronze medal in the women's singles competition at the 2019 FIL World Luge Championships in Winterberg.

Military career
According to Sweeney, she was inspired to join the Army National Guard by hearing her grandfather, Jack Sweeney, tell stories about his time in the Navy. She enlisted as a military policewoman and attended basic and advanced individual training at the US Army Military Police School on Fort Leonard Wood, Missouri. She graduated with honors. After initial training, she joined the U.S. Army World Class Athlete Program. She served in the New York Army National Guard with the 206th Military Police Company and the Joint Force Headquarters in New York. She was a sergeant.

References

External links

1993 births
Living people
American female lugers
American military Olympians
American military police officers
Olympic lugers of the United States
Lugers at the 2018 Winter Olympics
Lugers at the 2022 Winter Olympics
New York National Guard personnel
Sportspeople from Portland, Maine
United States Army non-commissioned officers
21st-century American women
U.S. Army World Class Athlete Program